On February 8, 2023, a bus driver crashed a Société de transport de Laval (STL) bus into a daycare in the Sainte-Rose district of Laval, Quebec, Canada, killing two children and hospitalizing six others. The driver exited the bus immediately after the crash, screaming hysterically and tearing off his clothes. He was immediately subdued by parents and residents and arrested by police minutes after the crash. 

Police secured the scene and children were moved to another school, where police and teachers calmed the children and reunited them with their panicked parents. A spontaneous memorial of teddy bears and flowers appeared just outside the crash scene by evening. Trauma experts were on hand to support residents and parents. The next day, Premier of Quebec Francois Legault paid his respects at the scene, and Prime Minister of Canada Justin Trudeau attended a memorial service at the Sainte-Rose-de-Lima Church the following day.      

The driver was identified as 51-year old Pierre Ny St-Amand, a father-of-two living in Laval with no prior known history of criminal behaviour or mental illness. A psychiatric assessment has found the accused fit to stand trial. On February 24, a Quebec Superior Court in Laval ordered that another psychiatric assessment assess his criminal responsibility for the crash, and set his next court date for March 28.

Incident 
On the morning of Wednesday, February 8, 2023, parents were dropping off their children at the Garderie Éducative de Sainte-Rose daycare on Terrasse Dufferin, a cul-de-sac in Sainte-Rose district of Laval. Buses for the Société de Transport de Laval route 151 line operate regularly on this road, turning around in the roundabout at the end of the road to get to the bus stop near the daycare. 

At around 8:30 am EST, witnesses first heard a bus operated by driver Pierre Ny St-Amand rev its engine. The bus turned sharply into the daycare driveway, and headed at 30 or 40 kilometers per hour straight to the part of the building where four- and five-year-olds gather. The bus smashed down the exterior wall of the daycare on impact, and almost brought down parts of the roof.

The driver climbed out of the vehicle after the crash and began to take off his clothes while screaming. Witnesses and parents quickly subdued the man, while others rushed into the building to pull out injured children as chunks of the ceiling fell to the floor. Police and ambulance arrived within minutes. The driver was cuffed and dragged naked and in hysterics to the police car. Witnesses described him as not in his right mind.

Aftermath 
Two boys and two girls were taken to Sainte-Justine children's hospital in Montreal; three others were taken to Cité-de-la-Santé hospital in Laval. Uninjured children were taken to nearby elementary school where police and daycare workers calmed the children. Panicked parents that showed up at the blocked-off crash site were directed towards the school and had to wait two hours as identities were confirmed. Parents of injured children were taken out of the room and informed of their children's status, and the remaining parents told their children were safe.

At noon, police announced that one child was pronounced dead on the scene, while another died in the hospital. The victims were later identified as Jacob Gauthier, aged 4, and Maëva David, aged 5.  

Two of four children aged three- to five-years-old taken in by Sainte-Justine Hospital were released the following day. The bus was towed from the scene late in the evening.

By the evening, bereaved local residents had set up a spontaneous memorial with flowers and stuffed animals. Police and social services set up a command post to offer mental health support to visitors. Residents gathered in the evening to console each other at the Sainte-Rose-de-Lima parish church. The following morning, Quebec Premier François Legault and leaders of provincial opposition parties laid flowers and expressed condolences at the scene. A moment of silence was observed at the provincial legislature in Quebec City and at the Canadian House of Commons in Ottawa. Daycares all over Quebec flew white flags in solidarity with the crash victims. In the evening,  Canadian Prime Minister Justin Trudeau and Laval mayor Stéphane Boyer paid their respects at the vigil with dozens of people gathered in front of the church.

Quebec minister of social services Lionel Carmant announced that the driver was not on waiting lists for mental health services. Several legal experts questioned the legality of the Minister accessing and publicizing private health records. 

The crash prompted calls from parents groups for stronger safety measures to control speed around schools and daycares with more bollards and speed bumps.
 
On February 15, bus drivers in Laval and Montreal paused operations for a moment of silence to reflect and to pay their respects one week after the crash.

Accused

Background 
The bus driver was identified as 51-year old Pierre Ny St-Amand. Born in Cambodia, he arrived in Canada in 1983 in the aftermath of the Cambodian genocide and was adopted as an orphan by a Québécois family originally from New Brunswick. He grew up in Sept-Îles, in the Côte-Nord region. He changed his given name from Ny to Pierre Ny in 1991. 

In the late 1990s, he attended and graduated from College Montmorency in Laval. College officials say he had a difficult childhood and was often rejected by others, but received considerable support from the college, remained  active in alumni activities, and was a quiet and kind person. He had worked for the STL for 10 years and had no previous criminal convictions.

St-Amand lived in Laval in a detached house with his partner since 2014. Neighbours describe a doting father of two and express disbelief that a father could commit such a crime. He and his partner have been living together in a traditional Cambodian marriage for 10 years. This marriage has no legal status in Quebec, and they had been scheduled to be legally married in front of notary on March 11, 2023. Family friends say their marriage had no financial or obvious marital problems, and that their children do well in school.  
  
The Quebec association representing private daycares confirmed that he had no link to the daycare. According to health authorities, St-Amand was not on a waiting list for mental health services. He has no criminal record.

Legal proceedings  
St-Amand was arrested on the scene and was charged with two counts of first-degree murder, attempted murder, two counts of aggravated assault, and four counts of assault with a weapon causing bodily harm. 

Police cuffed and arrested the accused on arrival, dragging him naked to the police car. Witnesses said St-Amand was screaming unintelligibly with his eyes bulging, that he "wasn’t in his right mind", and "was in a different world". He was taken to Sacré-Coeur Hospital in Montreal to treat his injuries. 

In the evening, St-Amand appeared before a judge from his hospital bed via videoconference under police supervision, refusing to speak. He was ordered to undergo psychiatric evaluation. St-Amand allegedly hit a police officer during the hearing.

On 17 February, Quebec Superior Court Justice Carol Richer ordered another psychiatric evaluation by the Philippe-Pinel institute to see if the accused could understand  the proceedings and was fit to stand trial. St-Amand  appeared disheveled at the Laval courthouse, accompanied by four special constables who held down his arms during proceedings. His defense lawyer, Julien Lespérance Hudon, claimed that he was only occasionally able to speak with his client as he would lapse into an incommunicative state.

On 24 February, the accused was found fit to stand trial. St-Amand was much more alert and responsive than in the previous hearing. However, while both the prosecution and defense agreed that the psychiatric report indicated that St-Amand was able to understand the proceedings, they also noted  evidence in the report justifying another psychiatric evaluation to determine if he suffered a mental disorder at the at the time of the crash. Judge Marc-André Dagenais ordered a second psychiatric evaluation to determine if the accused was criminally responsible at the time of the crash and ordered the psychiatric report sealed. The next court date was set for March 28.

See also
 2023 Amqui truck attack

References

2023 in Quebec
2023 road incidents
2020s road incidents in North America
Bus incidents in Canada
February 2023 events in Canada
Laval, Quebec